Le Bourg-d'Iré is a former commune in the Maine-et-Loire department in western France. On 15 December 2016, it was merged into the new commune Segré-en-Anjou Bleu.

Geography
The river Verzée forms part of the commune's northwestern border, then flows east-southeast through the commune and crosses the village.

Population

See also
Communes of the Maine-et-Loire department

References

Former communes of Maine-et-Loire